Greenville is the county seat of and the most populous city in Pitt County, North Carolina, United States; the principal city of the Greenville metropolitan area; and the 12th-most populous city in North Carolina. Greenville is the health, entertainment, and educational hub of North Carolina's Tidewater and Coastal Plain. As of the 2020 census, there are 87,521 people in the city.

Greenville is the home of East Carolina University, the fourth-largest university in the University of North Carolina system, and ECU Health Medical Center, the flagship hospital for ECU Health and the teaching hospital for the Brody School of Medicine.

History

Founding
Greenville was founded in 1771 as "Martinsborough", after the Royal Governor Josiah Martin. In 1786, the name was changed to Greenesville in honor of General Nathanael Greene, the American Revolutionary War hero. It was later shortened to Greenville.

19th century
During Greenville's early years, the Tar River was a navigable waterway; and by the 1860s there were several established steamboat lines transporting passengers and goods on the river. Cotton was the leading agricultural crop, and Greenville became a major cotton export center. Before the turn of the century, however, tobacco surpassed cotton and became the leading money crop. Greenville became one of the state's leading tobacco marketing and warehouse centers.

20th century
For over a century, Greenville was recognized only as an important tobacco market and the home of a small state-supported college, chartered by the Legislature in March 1907 and named East Carolina Teacher's Training School, a co-ed institution. By the mid 1960s, East Carolina College had become the third-largest state-supported college, and enrollment approached 8,000 students — twice the 1960 enrollment figure. In 1967, it became East Carolina University. ECU Medical School admitted its first four-year class in 1977. At the turn of the century, enrollment at ECU topped the 18,000 mark, and now exceeds 29,000 students.

Greenville's current economic development began in 1963 when Empire Brush was recruited to the new Greenville Industrial Park established by Greenville Industries, Inc. (a for-profit land holding company) in partnership with the Pitt County Development Commission (established by a voter referendum in 1957) and Greenville Utilities Commission. One of the community's greatest successes came in 1968 when Burroughs Wellcome, a major pharmaceutical research and manufacturing firm, located a pharmaceutical development/manufacturing facility near the city. The site is now owned by Patheon, a Thermo Fisher Scientific company, which employs approximately 1,200 people. The city and Pitt County have also become home to many other major industries and businesses including Hyster-Yale Group, Grady-White Boats, Domtar Personal Care, Mayne Pharma, and DENSO (formerly ASMO). Greenville is also home to The HammockSource, the world's largest hammock manufacturer.

Hurricane Floyd

Many residents were not aware of the flooding until the water came into their homes. Most localized flooding happened overnight, and the Tar River suffered the worst flooding, exceeding 500-year flood levels along its lower stretches. An additional 20+ inches of rain had fallen prior in the month from the two passes of Hurricane Dennis.

Damages in Pitt County alone were estimated at $1.6 billion (1999 USD, $1.87 billion 2006 USD). Some residents in Greenville had to swim six feet underwater to reach the front doors of their homes and apartments. Due to the heavy flooding in downtown Greenville, the East Carolina Pirates were forced to relocate their football game against #9 Miami to N.C. State's Carter–Finley Stadium in Raleigh, where they beat the Hurricanes, 27–23.

Geography

Greenville is located at  (35.601613, −77.372366).

It is located in the inner Coastal Plain.

Climate
Like most of the state and all of its lower areas, Greenville has a humid subtropical climate.

Greenville is within the Middle Atlantic Coastal Forests ecoregion of the much larger Eastern Temperate Broadleaf Mixed Forests biome.

Demographics

2020 census

As of the 2020 United States census, there were 87,521 people, 37,402 households, and 18,115 families residing in the city.

2010 census
As of the census of 2010, there were 174,263 residents in the Greenville MSA, 130,204 households, and 110,997 residents residing within  of the city limit. The population density was 2,364.6 people per square mile (912.8/km), making Greenville the densest city in Eastern North Carolina. There were 130,204 housing units at an average density of 1,100.4 per square mile (424.8/km). The racial composition of the city was: 60.20% White, 32.14% African American, 5.06% Hispanic or Latino American, 1.82% Asian American, 0.80% Native American, 0.04% Native Hawaiian or Other Pacific Islander, 1.01% some other race, and 1.29% two or more races.

There were 25,204 households, out of which 23.0% had children under the age of 18 living with them, 30.8% were married couples living together, 13.8% had a female householder with no husband present, and 52.4% were non-families. 35.4% of all households were made up of individuals, and 6.4% had someone living alone who was 65 years of age or older. The average household size was 2.18 and the average family size was 2.91.

In the city, the age distribution of the population showed 18.8% under the age of 18, 28.7% from 18 to 24, 28.2% from 25 to 44, 15.5% from 45 to 64, and 8.8% who were 65 years of age or older. The median age was 26 years. For every 100 females, there were 86.2 males. For every 100 females age 18 and over, there were 82.9 males.

The median income for a household in the city was $28,648, and the median income for a family was $44,491. Males had a median income of $31,847 versus $26,324 for females. The per capita income for the city was $18,476. About 15.6% of families and 26.1% of the population were below the poverty line, including 24.1% of those under age 18 and 20.4% of those age 65 or over.

Religion
As with most of North Carolina, Greenville is predominantly Protestant Christian, with large concentrations of Baptists, Episcopalians, Methodists, and various other evangelical groups. Presbyterians, and Disciples of Christ, also constitute a significant portion of the population.  There is also a small Quaker meeting.

The Roman Catholic community in Greenville has seen steady growth over the years, with the migration of Hispanic workers to the area, along with significant numbers of people from the Mid-Atlantic and northeastern United States who work for East Carolina University, the ECU Health, and other employers. There are two primary Catholic Parishes in Greenville including St. Gabriel of the Sorrowful Mother on Dickinson Avenue and St. Peter Catholic Church on East 4th Street. St. Gabriel's serves hundreds of Spanish speaking families and supports a Head Start program in the West Greenville area. St. Peter's Catholic Church in Greenville supports a day school for grades K-8. Pope John Paul II Catholic High School supports grades 9–12.

Over the years, Greenville's Jewish community has seen continued growth. Congregation Bayt Shalom, a congregation affiliated with both Reform Judaism and Conservative Judaism, has around 80 member families and was previously led by the first African-American female rabbi in the United States, Alysa Stanton.

The growth and diverse nature of the city's population has also resulted in the addition of an Islamic Mosque and Hindu Temple within the last decade.

Greenville also has a growing Pagan community.

Economy

Companies with headquarters in Greenville include ECU Health, NMHG Americas, Grady-White Boats, Metrics, and Attends Health Care Products. The city's industry historically was centered on the sale and processing of tobacco, but today the major industries are health care, education and manufacturing. The largest employer is ECU Health (formerly Vidant Medical Center) and the second largest is East Carolina University with specialized manufacturing and scientific industries augmenting the employment portfolio. ECU Health is also home to the robotic heart surgery training center founded by Dr. Randolph Chitwood who holds several patents related to the daVinci surgical robot.

Arts and culture

Greenville is home to a wide range of cultural events on and off the East Carolina University campus. East Carolina University offers musical concerts, theatrical and dance productions, travel films, and lectures. The Greenville Museum of Art contains local art, as well as rotating exhibitions. Annually over 3,000 children participate in programs offered by the Museum and over 12,000 people visit the museum.

Theater is beginning to emerge in Greenville as well. Local groups such as the Greenville Theater Project and the Magnolia Arts Center offer outlets for both performers and audiences alike. Smiles and Frowns Playhouse produces children's theatre. Additionally, student groups such as SWASH Improv offer entertainment at the university and local establishments.

Aficionados of sacred organ and choral music have a major outlet in the city of Greenville in the form of the East Carolina Musical Arts Education Foundation, a non-profit organization centered on the Perkins & Wells Memorial Organ, C.B. Fisk, Opus 126 housed at St. Paul's Episcopal Church. The Foundation offers numerous organ and choral concerts annually, plus educational initiatives. The impressive Fisk organ at St. Paul's Episcopal Church is also the primary teaching and performing instrument for East Carolina University, with which St. Paul's and ECMAEF make up a strategic alliance.

Along with Theater, Dance is becoming prominent in Greenville. The Greenville Civic Ballet and the North Carolina Academy of Dance Arts are the main contributors of dance to the community. The Greenville Civic Ballet, owned by Kimberly Gray Saad, holds performances showcasing different dance backgrounds and styles. They hold biannual performances including Cinderella, Peter and the Wolf, Sleeping Beauty and Nutcracker Suites. Greenville Civic offers a diverse dance culture. The North Carolina Academy of Dance Arts is owned by Sherryl Tipton and collaborates with ECU's dance major program. NCADA does an annual Nutcracker performance in winter and in spring does a studio showcase. NCADA keeps a traditional dance culture in Greenville's community. Paired with the innovation of Greenville Civic's performances, the community is thriving with dance.

Many restaurants and nightclubs offer live entertainment on the weekends. In the old Five Points area (in the newly renovated parking lot at Evans and Fifth Streets) every Wednesday in warm months, an Umbrella Market features local growers and producers plus crafts people. This is also the venue for "Freeboot Friday" on Fridays in the fall when there is a Saturday ECU home football game. It is an "Alive-At-Five" style pep-rally with live music, ECU cheerleaders, exhibits, children's activities, food samplings, and a beer and wine garden. The Downtown area is known for its large annual Halloween street party and live music bars. Considering the size of the city, Greenville as a large number of bars and nightclubs located downtown, due in large part to the location of ECU's campus which is immediately adjacent to downtown. In April 2019, Sup Dogs Restaurant was named the Best College Bar in America by Barstool Sports Barstool Best Bar bracket-style competition. In April 2020, Sup Dogs once again claimed the title.

Downtown Greenville has seen a huge resurgence since the recession. The area has been renamed to Uptown Greenville and has become the arts and entertainment hub of the area. Currently, Uptown Greenville houses over 20 restaurants and over 25 retail stores. It hosts several events throughout the year such as Sunday in the Park, The Umbrella Market, Freeboot Fridays and the Uptown Art Walk. Uptown has also become a popular residential destination in recent years with the development of new apartments and the renovation of existing infrastructure for residential use.

During warmer months, residents and visitors also take advantage of Greenville's access to the Tar River. Kayaking, fishing, and boating are popular pastimes along with camping and trail access along the banks of the river. In early 2020, the City Council also authorized the purchase of approximately 163 acres of land north of the Tar River that will be used for the development of an adventure park focusing on outdoor recreational activities such as running, hiking, biking and camping along with lake-based and river recreation. Greenville also features a greenway system of more than 9 miles that connects the medical and educational community with the Uptown District and Tar River.

Shopping
Greenville is the regional shopping destination for the Inner Banks area,  since many big-box retailers and specialty shops are located in the city. Large centers include Greenville Mall (formerly Colonial Mall Greenville and Pitt Plaza originally), University Commons, Lynncroft and Arlington Village. La Promenade, La Promenade II, Arlington Village, and Arlington Plaza located within Greenville Blvd, Arlington Blvd, and Red Banks Rd is one of the biggest outdoor/strip mall-type shopping locations in Greenville, housing over 60 shops and restaurants including Old Navy, Talbots, Olive Garden, and Longhorn Steakhouse. A new development called 11 Galleria, on the site of the former Carolina East Mall, features a number of big-box retailers. Already present are Kohl's, The Fresh Market, Dick's Sporting Goods, Hobby Lobby, and Academy Sports + Outdoors. A second Walmart recently opened on Highway 33 east along with additional restaurants and retail space.

Historic sites
The College View Historic District, Dickinson Avenue Historic District, E. B. Ficklen House, James L. Fleming House, Greenville Commercial Historic District, Greenville Tobacco Warehouse Historic District, Greenwreath, Robert Lee Humber House, Jones-Lee House, William H. Long House, Jesse R. Moye House, Oakmont, Pitt County Courthouse, Skinnerville-Greenville Heights Historic District, and U.S. Post Office are listed on the National Register of Historic Places.

Sports
ECU's sports teams, nicknamed the Pirates, compete in NCAA Division I FBS as a full-member of the American Athletic Conference. Facilities include the 50,000 seat Dowdy–Ficklen Stadium for football, the 8,000-seat Williams Arena at Minges Coliseum for men's and women's basketball, and the Clark-LeClair Stadium, with a seating capacity of 3,000 (max capacity of 6,000+ when including outfield "Jungle" areas) for baseball. In 2010 a state of the art, Lady Pirates softball stadium with a seating capacity of 1,500 has been completed, neighboring a new ECU track and field facility and soccer stadium plus an Olympic sports coach's offices and team rooms facility are in varying stages of completion all along Charles Boulevard, the main entry way for all Pirate sports.

Olympic gold medalist Mark Lenzi coached the East Carolina University Pirate Men's and Women's diving teams until his death in 2012.

Greenville has a strong tradition in Little League Baseball. Greenville Little Leagues was founded in 1951 and has two leagues; North State and Tar Heel. In 1998, a team from Greenville represented the South Region in the Little League World Series. They made it to the semi-finals, where they lost to eventual champion, Toms River, New Jersey. In 2017, Greenville again represented the Southeast region in the Little League World Series. In this run, the pitchers threw a combined perfect game, followed by a no-hitter, the first US team to throw back-to-back no hitters. They made it to the United States Championship Game, where they were eliminated by Lufkin, Texas.

Stallings Stadium at Elm Street Park is home to Little League baseball in Greenville. Along with Little League success, Greenville teams have also won multiple Babe Ruth Baseball titles. Since 2006, Greenville has sent Babe Ruth baseball teams to Southeast Regional competition each year in two different age groups, with two teams reaching the Babe Ruth World Series; the '06 15 yr. old team, and the '08 13 yr. old team. The 2006 team became the first Greenville Babe Ruth team to reach the World Series in 30 years, along with becoming the first Babe Ruth team to ever win a World Series game, defeating Clifton Park, New York 12–0. In 2012, the 13u Greenville All-Stars advanced to the Babe Ruth League World Series. The 2012 squad advanced to the championship game, falling to Bryant, Arkansas 4–3.

Greenville was home to minor league baseball. The Greenville Greenies was the primary moniker of the Greenville teams. Greenville played as members of the Eastern Carolina League (1928–1929) and Coastal Plain League (1934–1941, 1946–1951). The Greenville Greenies were an affiliate of the Washington Senators in 1939. The teams played at Guy Smith Stadium beginning in 1941. Previously, they played at Elm Street Park and Third Street Park.

Greenville is home to two major running groups, GoRun (Greenville Organization of Runners) and Greenville Running group.
In addition a large bicycling group, EC Velo, tours the city and Pitt County weekly.

Sports Tourism is a huge economic driver for Greenville and Pitt County, with the effort being spearheaded by the Greenville-Pitt County Sports Commission (Play Greenville, NC Sports). The Sports Commission has helped secure such national events as NCAA Championships, and starting in 2021, Greenville is the home of the Little League Softball World Series

Government

City Council
The City of Greenville has a Council-Manager form of government. The City Council, elected by the people, is the governing body of the city. The Council establishes policy relating to Greenville's government.

The Mayor presides at City Council meetings and signs documents authorized by the council. Together the Mayor and City Council are responsible for establishing general policies of the city and appointing members of the boards and commissions. Council enacts ordinances and resolutions; adopts the annual budget; approves the financing of all City operations; and authorizes contracts on behalf of the city.

The City Manager, hired by the City Council, is responsible for implementing the policies of City Council and managing the day-to-day operations of City government.

Five of the council members serve individual districts and the sixth is elected by the entire city and serves at-large, much like the mayor.

2019–2021 City Council
 Mayor P.J. Connelly (at-large)
 Mayor Pro Tem Rose Glover (District 2)
 Councilman Brian Meyerhoeffer (at-large)
 Councilwoman Monica Daniels (District 1)
 Councilman Will Bell (District 3)
 Councilman Rick Smiley (District 4)
 Councilman Will Litchfield (District 5)

The 2019-2021 council's term was extended until 2022. This was done so by legislation, and effected several municipalities across the state. The State Board of elections asked for this delay to "allow these municipalities to consider revising their electoral districts based on new population numbers from the 2020 U.S. Census." The election took place on May 17, 2022, in conjunction with the 2022 North Carolina Primary.

State Representatives
The City of Greenville has 3 members of the North Carolina General Assembly that represent their citizens. They are represented by Senate district 5 Sen. Don Davis in the State Senate, and House District 8 Rep. Kandie Smith & House District 9 Rep. Brian Farkas in the State House of Representatives.

Education
All Greenville schools fall under the Pitt County Schools (PCS) administration. PCS formed in 1985 when Pitt County Schools and Greenville City Schools merged. The 9-member Board of Education oversees all Greenville and Pitt County schools. In July 2013, Dr. Ethan Lenker was named Pitt County Schools Superintendent. As of 2022, there are 13 elementary schools, five middle schools, six traditional high schools, two early college high schools, and the Health Sciences Academy in Pitt County. There are also ten private schools.

Elementary schools
 Ayden Elementary School (K–5)
 Belvoir Elementary School (K–5)
 Bethel School (K-8)
 Chicod Elementary School (PreK–5)
 Creekside Elementary School (K–5)
 Eastern Elementary School (K–5)
 Elmhurst Elementary School (K–5)
 Falkland Elementary School (K–5)
 G.R. Whitfield School (K–8)
 Grifton School (K–8)
 H.B Sugg Elementary School (Previous (k-12) now (pk-2)) 
 Lakeforest Elementary School (K–5)
 Northwest Elementary School (K–5)
 Pactolus Elementary School (K–8)
 Ridgewood Elementary School (K–5) 
 Sam D. Bundy Elementary School (3-5) 
 South Greenville Elementary School (K–5)
 Stokes Elementary School (K–8)
 Wahl-Coates Elementary School  (K–5)
 W.H. Robinson Elementary School (K–5)
 Wintergreen Primary School (K–2)
 Wintergreen Intermediate School (3–5)

Middle schools
 A.G. Cox Middle School (6–8)
 Ayden Middle School (6–8)
 Chicod Middle School
 C.M. Eppes Middle School (6–8)
 E.B. Aycock Middle School (6–8)
 Farmville Middle School (6–8)
 Hope Middle School (6–8)
 Wellcome Middle School (6–8)

Public High schools
 Ayden-Grifton High School (9–12)
 D. H. Conley High School (9–12)
 Farmville Central High School (9–12)
 Junius H. Rose High School (9–12)
 North Pitt High School (9–12)
 South Central High School (9–12)

Higher learning
 East Carolina University
 Miller-Motte Technical College
 Pitt Community College
 Shaw University (satellite campus)

Private schools
 St. Paul's Episcopal Church Pre-School
 Brookhaven Christian School (K–8)
 Calvary Christian Academy (K–12)
 Christ Covenant School (K–12)
 Community Christian Academy (K–6)
 Faith Christian Academy (PK–5)
 Greenville Christian Academy (PK–12)
 Greenville Montessori School (PK–6)
 Montessori Today Inc. (PK)
 Pope John Paul II Catholic High School (9–12)
 St. Peter's Catholic School (PK–8)
 The Oakwood School (PK–12)
 Trinity Christian School (K–12)
 Victoria Christian Academy Christian Academy (K–12)

Media

Newspapers and publications
The Daily Reflector serves as the main daily newspaper and is Greenville's oldest business. Other notable newspapers that serve the city include G-Vegas Magazine, The Greenville Times, The East Carolinian, Her Magazine, The Minority Voice and Viva Greenville.

Radio stations serving Greenville
 1070 AM – WNCT Beach, Boogie & Blues
 1250 AM – WGHB Sports
 1340 AM – WOOW Gospel
 1570 AM – WECU Sports
 91.3 FM – WZMB East Carolina University
 92.1 FM – WRSV Urban Station
 93.3 FM – WERO Top 40 - All The Hits
 97.5 FM – WLGT Contemporary Christian
 101.9 FM – WIKS Hip Hop
 103.7 FM – WTIB Talk
 104.5 FM – WSTK The Vine Connection – Tradition Gospel Music
 106.9 FM – WBIS-LPFM Traditional gospel & Christian music
 107.9 FM – WNCT Classic hits
 99.5 FM - WMJV Hot Adult Contemporary

Television stations licensed in Greenville
 WNCT-TV – Greenville (CBS affiliate/The CW on DT2)
 WYDO-TV – Greenville (Fox affiliate)
 WUNK-TV – Greenville (PBS affiliate, part of the UNC-TV Network)
 WEPX-TV – Greenville (Ion Network affiliate)

Other television stations serving Greenville
 WITN-TV – Washington (NBC affiliate/My Network TV & Weather on DT2)
 WCTI-TV – New Bern (ABC affiliate/This TV & Other Programs on DT2)
 GPAT-TV – Greenville (Suddenlink Cable Channel 23 – Public-access television channel)
 GTV9 – Greenville's City Government-access television channel (Suddenlink Cable TV Channel 9)

Voice of America/IBB

Greenville was the largest transmitter site for the Voice of America shortwave broadcasts under the auspices of the U.S. government's International Broadcasting Bureau. Both transmitter buildings and three large antenna 'farms' were located just outside Greenville. The Greenville Transmitting Station provided shortwave broadcasts for U.S. government-funded, non-military, international broadcasting and served as a standby, alternate gateway for the Satellite Interconnect System to use to uplink programming, should the Washington, D.C., SIS gateway have become unavailable. The station was also a backup facility for uplinking programming to the Atlantic Ocean Region satellite and served as the primary return link of that satellite. For the VOA, the main target areas for the station's shortwave broadcasts were Latin America, the Caribbean with special emphasis on Cuba, and Africa. Three complexes, one for management, distribution, and monitoring, and the other two for actual transmitting, formed an approximately  equilateral triangle around Greenville. At one time, these formed the largest international broadcasting site in the world. Two of the three sites have been decommissioned.

Infrastructure

Health care
The health care community in Greenville is one of the largest in the state of North Carolina. With 861 beds, ECU Health Medical Center is the fifth largest hospital in North Carolina and is one of five academic medical centers in the state (others include the University of North Carolina at Chapel Hill, Duke University, Wake Forest University, and Campbell University). ECU Health Medical Center is the only trauma center east of Raleigh and serves as the teaching hospital for The Brody School of Medicine. The hospital hosts over 1,700 licensed medical providers and serves over 1.2 million residents of the region. Many medical offices and clinics along with the hospital and university teaching facilities lie on Greenville's west side, comprising what is known as the Medical District. The East Carolina Heart Institute is open and has added 250 jobs at the hospital along with a six floor facility. A new 418,000 square foot Cancer Center broke ground at ECU Health Medical Center. The 96 inpatient room facility serves as one of the major destinations for oncology patients in Eastern North Carolina. The Golden LEAF Foundation announced a $10.8 million grant in 2018 and The Eddie and Jo Allison Smith Family Foundation also donated $10 million. Vidant Cancer Care at the Eddie and Jo Allison Smith Tower opened in March 2018.

Transportation
Several major U.S. and state highways serve the area to provide easy access to the interstate highway system. Major highways that run through the area include US 264 (Martin Luther King Jr. Freeway), NC 11 (Memorial Drive), US 13 (Dickinson Avenue), NC 33, NC 43 (5th Street, Charles Blvd), and NC 903. Interstate 587 is an auxiliary interstate that bypasses U.S. 264 between Greenville and Farmville. Signs marking the interstate are expected to be put up in 2022. Greenville's busiest roads are along Memorial Dr., Greenville Blvd., Arlington Blvd., 10th St., Evans St., and Fire Tower Rd. With 2,364.6 people per square mile, Greenville is the most congested city in Eastern NC. NC 11 Bypass is a bypass route of NC 11 that was completed in 2019 after long planning. The road stems from an interchange with NC 11/US 13/NC 903/US 264, bypasses Winterville and the center of Ayden, and terminates approximately  later in rural Ayden. A new project called the 10th St Connector Project is also underway to connect existing 10th St to Stantonsburg Rd.

Rail freight transport for the city is provided by CSX Transportation, along a north–south corridor, and Norfolk Southern Railway, along a east–west corridor.

For public transportation, the G.K. Butterfield Transportation Center connects Uptown Greenville with local bus service, through the Greenville Area Transit (GREAT), and intercity bus service via Amtrak Thruway and Greyhound Lines. East Carolina University also operates a local bus service called ECU Transit, while Pitt Area Transit (PATS) provides "by request" transportation needs for those that live in Pitt County and not near neither local bus systems.

Air service is available through the Pitt-Greenville Airport with scheduled flights daily to Charlotte/Douglas International Airport via American Eagle regional partners Piedmont Airlines and PSA Airlines.

Greenville is in the process of building a more comprehensive system of greenways for bicycle and pedestrian transportation. The first section of the South Tar River Greenway opened in late 2009; the second section, linking a small and large dog run park with East Greenville was completed and dedicated in June 2011. The third section, uniting the Town Common (Downtown Greenville area) with the East Carolina University Schools of Allied Health, Dentistry, Medicine and Nursing, plus the ECU Health hospital complex is now in the paid for and planning stage.

As of 2022, the NCDOT Rail Division is studying the feasibility of Amtrak passenger rail transport between the city and Raleigh.

Notable people

 Jamie Brewington – MLB pitcher
 Fred Brooks – computer scientist
 Andre Brown – former NFL running back with the New York Giants
 Brian Brown – politician
 Sandra Bullock – actor and producer (ECU graduate)
 Derek Cox – NFL cornerback
 Alge Crumpler – NFL tight end
 Carlester Crumpler – NFL tight end
 Bernard Edwards – Chic bass player and producer
 Brian Farkas - Politician and North Carolina state legislator
 William J. Hadden – church minister, city councilman
 Garth Risk Hallberg – novelist
 Josh Harrington – BMX rider
 Wilber Hardee – Founder of Hardee's
 Whit Haydn – magician
 Al Hunter – NFL player
 Mike Laird – BMX rider
 Erica Lindbeck – voice actress
 Ma Haide (George Hatem) – physician to Mao
 Rico Hines (Rico Hines) – college basketball player, Basketball Asst Coach
 Will MacKenzie – PGA Tour golfer
 Daniel Dhers – BMX rider
 Dave Mirra – BMX rider
 MrBeast (Jimmy Donaldson) – YouTuber and philanthropist
 Greg Murphy – physician and politician
 Lee Norris – film and television actor
 Ryan Nyquist – BMX rider
 Mary H. Odom – North Carolina state legislator and politician
 Edward Cobb Outlaw – Rear admiral in the U.S. Navy
 Petey Pablo – Rapper
 Bronswell Patrick – MLB player for the Milwaukee Brewers and San Francisco Giants
 Tommy Paul – professional tennis player
 Lauren Perdue – 2012 U.S. Olympic Gold Medalist in Women's Swimming
 Cornell Powell – NFL player
 Rodney Purvis – NBA Player
 Ricky Racks – Hip hop artist
 Ashley Sheppard – NFL player
 Jessamine Shumate – artist, painter, cartographer
 Caroline Shaw – Pulitzer-prize-winning composer
 Kandie Smith Politician and North Carolina Legislator
 Tom Smith – musician, inductee into Jazz Education Hall of Fame
 Kentavius Street – NFL player
 Supastition — Hip hop artist
 Absalom Tatom – U.S. Congressman from North Carolina 1795 to 1796
 Billy Taylor – jazz musician, founder of Jazzmobile, CBS television personality
 Lawrence Tyson – World War I general and U.S. Senator
 James Harvey Ward – actor
 Katharine Whalen – musician, singer, and songwriter
 Joe West – MLB umpire
 Alex White – MLB pitcher
 Jermaine Williams – NFL football player

See also 
 List of municipalities in North Carolina

References

External links

 
 
 Greenville-Pitt County Chamber of Commerce
 Greenville Convention & Visitors Bureau

 
Cities in North Carolina
County seats in North Carolina
Greenville, North Carolina metropolitan area
Populated places established in 1774
1774 establishments in North Carolina
Cities in Pitt County, North Carolina